Agathonísi is a small Greek island and municipality located at the northernmost point of the Dodecanese in Greece. 
It is surrounded by many smaller islands and is home to two villages, both inland; Megalo Chorio ("Big Village"), and Mikro Chorio ("Small Village"). Between them is the small settlement of Agios Georgios (Saint George), which forms the island's only harbor and consists of a few hotels and restaurants.  The island is also locally known as Gaidaro ("Donkey"), or by its ancient name Tragea.

This peak is located close to Mikro Chorio. It is made almost entirely of subcrystalline stratified limestones, and is covered with thorny macchia. 

In the late 1920s the island had 80 inhabitants, active in agriculture and sheep rearing. A census of the island in 1981 showed that it was populated by 133 people. In 1991, another census showed that the population had dropped to 112. By the 2001 census it had again risen to 158 residents, and in 2011 its population was 185, 168 of whom lived in Megalo Chorio, and only 17 in Mikro Chorio.

Name
In ancient times, Agathonisi was known as Psetoussa. Ancient writers varied in recording its name: Tragia (Τραγία), Tragiae or Tragiai (Τραγίαι), Tragaeae or Tragaiai (Τραγαῖαι), and Tragaea or Tragaia (Τραγαία) are among the forms recorded. The island is known as Gaidaro in Italian and as Eşek Adası in Turkish.

History
Near the island, Pericles defeated the Samians in a naval engagement in 440 BCE. In modern times, the island (dependent on Patmos) was occupied in 1912 by the Kingdom of Italy during the Italo-Turkish war and, after being part of the Italian Islands of the Aegean (of which it was the northernmost islet), was ceded from Italy to Greece in 1947 with the Treaty of Peace.

Administration
In 2011, as part of the Kallikratis Plan, the island's status has been upgraded from Community to Municipality.

Archipelago of Agathonisi
Near Agathonisi lie several islets: Psatonisi, Strongili, Neronisi, Katagani, all made with crystalline limestones, and Kunellonisi, which is made of schistose-crystalline rocks.

References

Sources

Dodecanese
Islands of Greece
Populated places in Kalymnos (regional unit)
Municipalities of the South Aegean
Landforms of Kalymnos (regional unit)
Islands of the South Aegean